Melnikovka is a rural locality (a settlement) in Shimolinsky Selsoviet, Blagoveshchensky District, Altai Krai, Russia. The population was 323 as of 2013. It was founded in 1912. There are three streets.

Geography 
Melnikovka is located 48 km north of Blagoveshchenka (the district's administrative centre) by road. Boronsky is the nearest rural locality.

References 

Rural localities in Blagoveshchensky District, Altai Krai